Saami or SAAMI may refer to:

Sami people
Sami languages
Sporting Arms and Ammunition Manufacturers' Institute

Language and nationality disambiguation pages